William Dunlop (23 July 1985 – 7 July 2018) was a professional motorcycle racer from Northern Ireland who died as a result of a racing incident. Part of a motorcycle racing dynasty, William was the elder brother of Michael; both were sons of the late Robert Dunlop, and nephews of the late Joey Dunlop. He died as a result of a crash at a racing event in the Republic of Ireland.

Career
William started racing 125 cc bikes in 2000, when he was 15. During his racing career, he accumulated 108 Irish National Road Race wins.

In addition, he also achieved numerous victories at two of Ireland's prestigious road racing events, the North West 200 (4) and the Ulster Grand Prix (7). His best results at the Isle of Man TT saw him securing the third tier on the podium on four occasions with his best result being the runner up position in the 2016 TT Zero.

Until late 2015, Dunlop had raced for Tyco BMW Motorrad Racing campaigning the BMW S1000RR and a Suzuki GSX-R600. The 2016 season saw him competing at the main International Road Races aboard Yamaha YZF-R1 and Yamaha YZF-R6 in the Superbike and Supersport categories.

In addition, Dunlop campaigned a Kawasaki ZX-10R Superstock machine, provided by a different team, during selected rounds of the British Championship.

Dunlop also competed in eleven TT race seasons between 2006 and 2017, with a second place and four third places being his best results, in the 125 cc, SuperSport and Classic races. He won two races at the North West 200 with his first victory being in the 2009 250 cc event. 2009 also saw Dunlop take part in the last ever 250cc Grand Prix race at Valencia finishing 18th on a P J Flynn Bigman Racing Honda.

2014
Dunlop crashed his Tyco Suzuki Superbike in the final race of the week at the 2014 Isle of Man TT, during the Senior TT event. He led the race on time briefly during the first lap, but ran wide through the Graham Memorial corner on the mountain section on the third lap, running off the road up against the adjacent embankment, resulting in two fractures to his left leg.

2015
Dunlop got his 2015 season off to a positive start by clinching a brace of wins at a rain-soaked Tandragee 100. In the Supersport Class, Dunlop put in a very convincing performance on board the CD Racing Yamaha YZF-R6 and rounded the meeting off by taking victory in the Senior Open Race on the TAS BMW S1000RR.

Death 
Dunlop sustained fatal head injuries as a result of a crash during practice for the 2018 Skerries 100 Road Races in County Dublin. His Yamaha YZF-R1 bike spilled oil from the engine sump onto the back wheel, and as a result Dunlop lost control and crashed into a ditch and trees at the Sam's Tunnel part of the circuit.

On 26 February 2022, a statue of William Dunlop was added to the Memorial Garden in Ballymoney, where there were memorials to his father Robert and uncle Joey.

Career statistics

Grand Prix motorcycle racing

By season

Races by year

Complete TT record

See also
Robert Dunlop
Joey Dunlop
Michael Dunlop
2009 Grand Prix motorcycle racing season
North West 200
Isle of Man TT
Road (2014 film)

References

External links

Isle of Man Database TT biography
William Dunlop Racing Official Website

1985 births
2018 deaths
Isle of Man TT riders
Motorcycle racers from Northern Ireland
People from Ballymoney
250cc World Championship riders
Motorcycle racers who died while racing
Sport deaths in the Republic of Ireland
William